The Colorado Rockies' 1994 season was the second for the Rockies. They tried to win the National League West. Don Baylor was their manager. They played home games at Mile High Stadium. They finished with a record of 53-64, 3rd in the division. The season was cut short by a player strike.

Offseason

October 29, 1993: Marvin Freeman was signed as a free agent by the Colorado Rockies.
November 19, 1993: Howard Johnson was signed as a free agent by the Colorado Rockies.
November 30, 1993: Ellis Burks was signed as a free agent by the Colorado Rockies.
January 7, 1994: Walt Weiss was signed as a free agent by the Colorado Rockies.
March 31, 1994: John Vander Wal was purchased by the Colorado Rockies from the Montreal Expos.

Regular season
By Friday, August 12, the Rockies had compiled a 53-64 record through 117 games. They were drawing really well at home, with an attendance of 3,281,511 through 57 home games for an average of 57,570 per game. At that pace, the team would have had a good chance of drawing more than 4.6 million fans in their 81 home games if the season had continued. Offensively, the Rockies had scored 573 runs (4.90 per game) and allowed 638 runs (5.45 per game) prior to the strike.

The Rockies tied the Chicago White Sox in 1994 for the most triples in the majors, with 39. Their pitchers, however, hit 49 batters: the most in the majors

Opening Day starters
Dante Bichette
Ellis Burks
Andrés Galarraga
Joe Girardi
Charlie Hayes
Howard Johnson
Roberto Mejía
Armando Reynoso
Walt Weiss

Transactions
June 2, 1994: Doug Million was drafted by the Colorado Rockies in the 1st round of the 1994 amateur draft.
June 3, 1994: Keith Shepherd was traded by the Colorado Rockies to the Boston Red Sox for Brian Conroy (minors).
June 27, 1994: Kent Bottenfield was granted free agency by the Colorado Rockies.

Major League debuts
Batters:
Trent Hubbard (Jul 7)
Pitchers:
Mark Thompson (Jul 26)
Jim Czajkowski (Jul 29)

Roster

Season standings

Record vs. opponents

Game log 

|-  style="text-align:center; background:#fbb;"
| 1 || April 4 || Phillies || 12–6 || Slocumb (1–0) || Munoz (0–1) || || 72,470 || 0–1
|-  style="text-align:center; background:#fbb;"
| 2 || April 6 || Phillies || 7–5 || Mason (1–0) || Holmes (0–1) || Jones (1) || 50,875 || 0–2
|-  style="text-align:center; background:#fbb;"
| 3 || April 7 || Phillies || 13–8 || Slocumb (2–0) || Reed (0–1) || Muñoz (1) || 48,021 || 0–3
|-  style="text-align:center; background:#bfb;"
| 4 || April 8 || @ Pirates || 7–3 || Nied (1–0) || Wagner (0–1) || || 44,136 || 1–3
|-  style="text-align:center; background:#fbb;"
| 5 || April 9 || @ Pirates || 10–5 || Smith (1–1) || Reynoso (0–1) || || 17,458 || 1–4
|-  style="text-align:center; background:#bfb;"
| 6 || April 11 || @ Phillies || 8–7 || Ruffin (1–0) || Mason (1–1) || Holmes (1) || 58,627 || 2–4
|-  style="text-align:center; background:#fbb;"
| 7 || April 13 || @ Phillies || 12–3 || Rivera (1–0) || Harris (0–1) || || 23,346 || 2–5
|-  style="text-align:center; background:#bfb;"
| 8 || April 14 || @ Phillies || 5–0 || Nied (2–0) || Schilling (0–2) || || 24,856 || 3–5
|-  style="text-align:center; background:#bfb;"
| 9 || April 15 || Expos || 9–2 || Reynoso (1–1) || Fassero (0–1) || || 47,213 || 4–5 || Boxscore
|-  style="text-align:center; background:#bfb;"
| 10 || April 16 || Expos || 7–3 || Reed (1–1) || Hill (2–1) || || 51,347 || 5–5 || Boxscore
|-  style="text-align:center; background:#bfb;"
| 11 || April 17 || Expos || 6–5 (10) || Munoz (1–1) || Heredia (0–2) || || 55,443 || 6–5 || Boxscore
|-  style="text-align:center; background:#fbb;"
| 12 || April 18 || Marlins || 5–3 || Aquino (1–0) || Holmes (0–2) || Harvey (4) || 46,283 || 6–6
|-  style="text-align:center; background:#fbb;"
| 13 || April 19 || Marlins || 6–4 || Weathers (2–1) || Nied (2–1) || Harvey (5) || 50,217 || 6–7
|-  style="text-align:center; background:#bfb;"
| 14 || April 20 || Marlins || 16–6 || Freeman (1–0) || Nen (0–1) || || 45,667 || 7–7
|-  style="text-align:center; background:#fbb;"
| 15 || April 22 || Cubs || 9–2 || Banks (2–2) || Harkey (0–1) || || 54,195 || 7–8
|-  style="text-align:center; background:#bfb;"
| 16 || April 23 || Cubs || 8–2 || Harris (1–1) || Morgan (0–3) || || 68,743 || 8–8
|-  style="text-align:center; background:#fbb;"
| 17 || April 24 || Cubs || 12–4 || Trachsel (2–1) || Nied (2–2) || || 71,329 || 8–9
|-  style="text-align:center; background:#bfb;"
| 18 || April 25 || @ Cardinals || 7–6 || Freeman (2–0) || Urbani (0–2) || Holmes (2) || 23,628 || 9–9
|-  style="text-align:center; background:#fbb;"
| 19 || April 26 || @ Cardinals || 2–1 || Tewksbury (5–0) || Reynoso (1–2) || || 23,094 || 9–10
|-  style="text-align:center; background:#fbb;"
| 20 || April 27 || @ Marlins || 3–2 || Hough (2–0) || Harkey (0–2) || Hernandez (2) || 24,114 || 9–11
|-  style="text-align:center; background:#fbb;"
| 21 || April 28 || @ Marlins || 8–7 || Nen (1–1) || Blair (0–1) || Hernandez (3) || 32,236 || 9–12
|-  style="text-align:center; background:#bfb;"
| 22 || April 29 || @ Cubs || 6–5 || Nied (3–2) || Trachsel (2–2) || Holmes (3) || 34,179 || 10–12
|-

|-  style="text-align:center; background:#bfb;"
| 23 || May 1 || @ Cubs || 6–2 || Freeman (3–0) || Young (0–2) || || 26,558 || 11–12
|-  style="text-align:center; background:#bfb;"
| 24 || May 3 || Cardinals || 10–1 || Reynoso (2–2) || Palacios (0–1) || || 46,326 || 12–12
|-  style="text-align:center; background:#fbb;"
| 25 || May 4 || Cardinals || 6–5 || Smith (1–0) || Holmes (0–3) || Murphy (2) || 51,639 || 12–13
|-  style="text-align:center; background:#fbb;"
| 26 || May 6 || @ Padres || 8–0 || Benes (2–5) || Harkey (0–3) || || 15,574 || 12–14
|-  style="text-align:center; background:#fbb;"
| 27 || May 7 || @ Padres || 2–1 || Hoffman (2–0) || Ruffin (1–1) || || 36,296 || 12–15
|-  style="text-align:center; background:#bfb;"
| 28 || May 8 || @ Padres || 1–0 || Nied (4–2) || Harris (1–1) || Reed (1) || 14,328 || 13–15
|-  style="text-align:center; background:#fbb;"
| 29 || May 9 || @ Giants || 12–5 || Hickerson (2–1) || Reynoso (2–3) || || 14,472 || 13–16
|-  style="text-align:center; background:#bfb;"
| 30 || May 10 || @ Giants || 4–2 || Harris (2–1) || Burkett (3–3) || Ruffin (1) || 15,182 || 14–16
|-  style="text-align:center; background:#fbb;"
| 31 || May 11 || @ Giants || 6–1 || Swift (5–3) || Harkey (0–4) || || 16,759 || 14–17
|-  style="text-align:center; background:#fbb;"
| 32 || May 13 || @ Astros || 4–2 || Drabek (5–1) || Freeman (3–1) || || 29,962 || 14–18
|-  style="text-align:center; background:#bfb;"
| 33 || May 14 || @ Astros || 4–2 || Nied (5–2) || Kile (3–2) || Ruffin (2) || 23,037 || 15–18
|-  style="text-align:center; background:#bfb;"
| 34 || May 15 || @ Astros || 4–0 || Reynoso (3–3) || Swindell (3–1) || || 21,004 || 16–18
|-  style="text-align:center; background:#fbb;"
| 35 || May 16 || Dodgers || 9–2 || Martínez (2–2) || Harris (2–2) || || 50,507 || 16–19
|-  style="text-align:center; background:#bfb;"
| 36 || May 17 || Dodgers || 7–6 || Bottenfield (1–0) || Dreifort (0–3) || || 53,589 || 17–19
|-  style="text-align:center; background:#fbb;"
| 37 || May 18 || Dodgers || 5–2 || Gross (3–1) || Blair (0–2) || Gott (1) || 54,108 || 17–20
|-  style="text-align:center; background:#fbb;"
| 38 || May 19 || Dodgers || 8–2 || Hershiser (3–0) || Nied (5–3) || || 51,515 || 17–21
|-  style="text-align:center; background:#fbb;"
| 39 || May 20 || Braves || 7–1 || Avery (5–1) || Reynoso (3–4) || || 71,368 || 17–22
|-  style="text-align:center; background:#fbb;"
| 40 || May 21 || Braves || 5–4 || Mercker (3–0) || Harris (2–3) || McMichael (9) || 72,123 || 17–23
|-  style="text-align:center; background:#fbb;"
| 41 || May 22 || Braves || 8–3 || Maddux (7–2) || Painter (0–1) || || 71,523 || 17–24
|-  style="text-align:center; background:#bfb;"
| 42 || May 23 || Reds || 8–3 || Freeman (4–1) || Smiley (4–5) || Ruffin (3) || 45,713 || 18–24
|-  style="text-align:center; background:#bfb;"
| 43 || May 24 || Reds || 11–7 || Bottenfield (2–0) || Hanson (3–4) || || 47,885 || 19–24
|-  style="text-align:center; background:#bfb;"
| 44 || May 25 || Reds || 3–2 || Harkey (1–4) || Rijo (2–3) || Ruffin (4) || 47,264 || 20–24
|-  style="text-align:center; background:#fbb;"
| 45 || May 26 || Reds || 14–4 || Roper (1–0) || Harris (2–4) || || 53,407 || 20–25
|-  style="text-align:center; background:#fbb;"
| 46 || May 27 || @ Expos || 4–2 || White (1–0) || Painter (0–2) || Wetteland (6) || 22,882 || 20–26 || Boxscore
|-  style="text-align:center; background:#bfb;"
| 47 || May 28 || @ Expos || 3–2 (10) || Ruffin (2–1) || Scott (1–2) || Bottenfield (1) || 30,452 || 21–26 || Boxscore
|-  style="text-align:center; background:#fbb;"
| 48 || May 29 || @ Expos || 4–3 (10) || Scott (2–2) || Ruffin (2–2) || || 26,774 || 21–27 || Boxscore
|-  style="text-align:center; background:#bfb;"
| 49 || May 30 || @ Mets || 12–2 || Ritz (1–0) || Gozzo (2–2) || Blair (1) || 20,705 || 22–27
|-  style="text-align:center; background:#bfb;"
| 50 || May 31 || @ Mets || 3–2 || Harris (3–4) || Linton (4–2) || Ruffin (5) || 15,515 || 23–27
|-

|-  style="text-align:center; background:#bfb;"
| 51 || June 1 || @ Mets || 4–3 || Bottenfield (3–0) || Smith (3–6) || Ruffin (6) || 17,099 || 24–27
|-  style="text-align:center; background:#bfb;"
| 52 || June 3 || Pirates || 6–4 || Freeman (5–1) || Neagle (5–6) || Ruffin (7) || 53,737 || 25–27
|-  style="text-align:center; background:#fbb;"
| 53 || June 4 || Pirates || 4–3 || Smith (5–5) || Ritz (1–1) || Dewey (1) || 61,619 || 25–28
|-  style="text-align:center; background:#fbb;"
| 54 || June 5 || Pirates || 4–3 || White (2–3) || Moore (0–1) || Ballard (2) || 63,653 || 25–29
|-  style="text-align:center; background:#fbb;"
| 55 || June 6 || Mets || 11–3 || Linton (5–2) || Bottenfield (3–1) || || 51,679 || 25–30
|-  style="text-align:center; background:#bfb;"
| 56 || June 7 || Mets || 10–8 || Ruffin (3–2) || Mason (2–3) || Munoz (1) || 51,018 || 26–30
|-  style="text-align:center; background:#bfb;"
| 57 || June 8 || Mets || 5–4 || Moore (1–1) || Saberhagen (6–3) || Ruffin (8) || 52,117 || 27–30
|-  style="text-align:center; background:#fbb;"
| 58 || June 9 || @ Reds || 7–1 || Rijo (5–3) || Ritz (1–2) || || 31,990 || 27–31
|-  style="text-align:center; background:#fbb;"
| 59 || June 10 || @ Reds || 10–4 || Roper (2–0) || Harris (3–5) || || 33,610 || 27–32
|-  style="text-align:center; background:#fbb;"
| 60 || June 11 || @ Reds || 6–4 || Fortugno (1–0) || Nied (5–4) || McElroy (3) || 36,887 || 27–33
|-  style="text-align:center; background:#bfb;"
| 61 || June 12 || @ Reds || 3–2 || Reed (2–1) || Carrasco (3–3) || Ruffin (9) || 30,992 || 28–33
|-  style="text-align:center; background:#bfb;"
| 62 || June 13 || @ Braves || 7–2 || Freeman (6–1) || Glavine (7–6) || || 48,528 || 29–33
|-  style="text-align:center; background:#fbb;"
| 63 || June 14 || @ Braves || 3–1 || Mercker (5–1) || Ritz (1–3) || McMichael (15) || 44,545 || 29–34
|-  style="text-align:center; background:#fbb;"
| 64 || June 15 || @ Braves || 4–0 || Smoltz (5–6) || Harris (3–6) || || 45,429 || 29–35
|-  style="text-align:center; background:#fbb;"
| 65 || June 16 || @ Braves || 11–8 || Stanton (2–1) || Ruffin (3–3) || McMichael (16) || 45,827 || 29–36
|-  style="text-align:center; background:#bfb;"
| 66 || June 17 || @ Dodgers || 13–5 || Painter (1–2) || Hershiser (3–4) || Blair (2) || 39,609 || 30–36
|-  style="text-align:center; background:#bfb;"
| 67 || June 18 || @ Dodgers || 9–3 || Freeman (7–1) || Martínez (6–3) || || 50,482 || 31–36
|-  style="text-align:center; background:#fbb;"
| 68 || June 19 || @ Dodgers || 7–3 || Astacio (5–5) || Ritz (1–4) || || 51,015 || 31–37
|-  style="text-align:center; background:#fbb;"
| 69 || June 20 || Astros || 5–4 || Drabek (10–3) || Harris (3–7) || Hudek (11) || 50,671 || 31–38
|-  style="text-align:center; background:#bfb;"
| 70 || June 21 || Astros || 8–0 || Nied (6–4) || Kile (5–3) || || 56,913 || 32–38
|-  style="text-align:center; background:#bfb;"
| 71 || June 22 || Astros || 14–5 || Painter (2–2) || Swindell (5–5) || || 50,887 || 33–38
|-  style="text-align:center; background:#fbb;"
| 72 || June 24 || Giants || 10–3 || Van Landingham (3–0) || Blair (0–3) || || 73,957 || 33–39
|-  style="text-align:center; background:#bfb;"
| 73 || June 25 || Giants || 6–4 || Munoz (2–1) || Torres (2–7) || Ruffin (10) || 69,881 || 34–39
|-  style="text-align:center; background:#fbb;"
| 74 || June 26 || Giants || 8–1 || Burkett (5–6) || Harris (3–8) || || 73,171 || 34–40
|-  style="text-align:center; background:#bfb;"
| 75 || June 27 || Padres || 12–7 || Nied (7–4) || Ashby (3–6) || || 52,949 || 35–40
|-  style="text-align:center; background:#bfb;"
| 76 || June 28 || Padres || 10–9 || Munoz (3–1) || Elliott (0–1) || Ruffin (11) || || 36–40
|-  style="text-align:center; background:#fbb;"
| 77 || June 28 || Padres || 11–3 (11) || Hoffman (3–3) || Harris (3–9) || || 55,021 || 36–41
|-  style="text-align:center; background:#fbb;"
| 78 || June 29 || Padres || 10–4 || Tabaka (2–1) || Blair (0–4) || Martínez (3) || 50,173 || 36–42
|-  style="text-align:center; background:#fbb;"
| 79 || June 30 || @ Cardinals || 9–7 || Murphy (4–3) || Munoz (3–2) || Olivares (1) || 35,648 || 36–43
|-

|-  style="text-align:center; background:#fbb;"
| 80 || July 1 || @ Cardinals || 11–4 || Sutcliffe (5–3) || Harris (3–10) || Cimorelli (1) || 26,284 || 36–44
|-  style="text-align:center; background:#bfb;"
| 81 || July 2 || @ Cardinals || 7–5 || Munoz (4–2) || Rodriguez (2–3) || Ruffin (12) || 39,785 || 37–44
|-  style="text-align:center; background:#bfb;"
| 82 || July 3 || @ Cardinals || 5–2 || Reed (3–1) || Arocha (4–4) || Ruffin (13) || 35,093 || 38–44
|-  style="text-align:center; background:#fbb;"
| 83 || July 4 || @ Cubs || 4–3 || Bautista (2–3) || Ruffin (3–4) || || || 38–45
|-  style="text-align:center; background:#bfb;"
| 84 || July 4 || @ Cubs || 4–2 (15) || Walton (1–0) || Myers (1–4) || Harris (1) || 37,167 || 39–45
|-  style="text-align:center; background:#bfb;"
| 85 || July 5 || @ Cubs || 9–6 || Ritz (2–4) || Crim (3–3) || Blair (3) || 30,142 || 40–45
|-  style="text-align:center; background:#bfb;"
| 86 || July 6 || @ Cubs || 7–1 || Leskanic (1–0) || Trachsel (7–6) || Ruffin (14) || 32,637 || 41–45
|-  style="text-align:center; background:#bfb;"
| 87 || July 7 || @ Marlins || 2–1 || Nied (8–4) || Johnstone (1–1) || || 28,783 || 42–45
|-  style="text-align:center; background:#fbb;"
| 88 || July 8 || @ Marlins || 5–2 || Weathers (8–7) || Painter (2–3) || Nen (8) || 26,498 || 42–46
|-  style="text-align:center; background:#fbb;"
| 89 || July 9 || @ Marlins || 4–2 || Rapp (5–5) || Freeman (7–2) || Nen (9) || 38,345 || 42–47
|-  style="text-align:center; background:#fbb;"
| 90 || July 10 || @ Marlins || 6–4 || Aquino (2–1) || Harkey (1–5) || Nen (10) || 33,593 || 42–48
|-  style="text-align:center; background:#bbcaff;"
|align="center" colspan="10"|All-Star Break: NL def. AL at Three Rivers Stadium, 8–7 (10)
|-  style="text-align:center; background:#bfb;"
| 91 || July 14 || Cardinals || 8–1 || Nied (9–4) || Pérez (2–3) || || 63,745 || 43–48
|-  style="text-align:center; background:#bfb;"
| 92 || July 15 || Cardinals || 10–6 || Ritz (3–4) || Tewksbury (10–8) || || 63,179 || 44–48
|-  style="text-align:center; background:#bfb;"
| 93 || July 16 || Cardinals || 15–4 || Painter (3–3) || Olivares (1–2) || || 70,217 || 45–48
|-  style="text-align:center; background:#bfb;"
| 94 || July 17 || Cardinals || 10–6 || Freeman (8–2) || Sutcliffe (5–4) || || 61,972 || 46–48
|-  style="text-align:center; background:#fbb;"
| 95 || July 18 || Cubs || 6–3 || Bullinger (4–2) || Harkey (1–6) || || 63,438 || 46–49
|-  style="text-align:center; background:#fbb;"
| 96 || July 19 || Cubs || 6–1 || Trachsel (9–6) || Nied (9–5) || || 70,493 || 46–50
|-  style="text-align:center; background:#fbb;"
| 97 || July 20 || Cubs || 9–8 || Veres (1–0) || Reed (3–2) || Plesac (1) || 60,173 || 46–51
|-  style="text-align:center; background:#fbb;"
| 98 || July 22 || Marlins || 4–0 || Rapp (6–5) || Painter (3–4) || || 58,613 || 46–52
|-  style="text-align:center; background:#bfb;"
| 99 || July 23 || Marlins || 5–4 || Freeman (9–2) || Scheid (0–2) || Ruffin (15) || 70,289 || 47–52
|-  style="text-align:center; background:#fbb;"
| 100 || July 24 || Marlins || 6–4 || Nen (4–4) || Blair (0–5) || || 68,045 || 47–53
|-  style="text-align:center; background:#bfb;"
| 101 || July 25 || @ Padres || 4–3 || Ritz (4–4) || Benes (6–12) || Ruffin (16) || 9,195 || 48–53
|-  style="text-align:center; background:#bfb;"
| 102 || July 26 || @ Padres || 6–5 || Thompson (1–0) || Sanders (3–8) || Reed (2) || 11,896 || 49–53
|-  style="text-align:center; background:#fbb;"
| 103 || July 27 || @ Padres || 9–2 || Hamilton (7–5) || Painter (3–5) || Mauser (2) || 9,666 || 49–54
|-  style="text-align:center; background:#bfb;"
| 104 || July 28 || @ Giants || 5–1 || Freeman (10–2) || Monteleone (3–3) || || 31,130 || 50–54
|-  style="text-align:center; background:#fbb;"
| 105 || July 29 || @ Giants || 8–4 || Black (4–1) || Nied (9–6) || || 25,192 || 50–55
|-  style="text-align:center; background:#fbb;"
| 106 || July 30 || @ Giants || 6–4 || Portugal (10–7) || Ritz (4–5) || Beck (25) || 49,627 || 50–56
|-  style="text-align:center; background:#fbb;"
| 107 || July 31 || @ Giants || 9–4 || Van Landingham (7–1) || Thompson (1–1) || Hickerson (1) || 50,007 || 50–57
|-

|-  style="text-align:center; background:#bfb;"
| 108 || August 1 || @ Astros || 8–3 || Painter (4–5) || Harnisch (7–5) || || 22,256 || 51–57
|-  style="text-align:center; background:#fbb;"
| 109 || August 2 || @ Astros || 3–1 || Drabek (11–6) || Harris (3–11) || || 22,574 || 51–58
|-  style="text-align:center; background:#fbb;"
| 110 || August 3 || @ Astros || 2–1 || Jones (5–2) || Ruffin (3–5) || || 18,320 || 51–59
|-  style="text-align:center; background:#fbb;"
| 111 || August 4 || @ Astros || 6–2 || Kile (8–6) || Ritz (4–6) || || 30,053 || 51–60
|-  style="text-align:center; background:#fbb;"
| 112 || August 5 || Dodgers || 5–4 || Martínez (11–7) || Leskanic (1–1) || Worrell (10) || 70,283 || 51–61
|-  style="text-align:center; background:#fbb;"
| 113 || August 7 || Dodgers || 6–2 || Hershiser (6–6) || Harris (3–12) || || 70,372 || 51–62
|-  style="text-align:center; background:#bfb;"
| 114 || August 8 || Dodgers || 7–6 || Ruffin (4–5) || Worrell (6–5) || || 52,634 || 52–62
|-  style="text-align:center; background:#fbb;"
| 115 || August 9 || Braves || 7–4 || McMichael (4–6) || Nied (9–7) || || 61,595 || 52–63
|-  style="text-align:center; background:#bfb;"
| 116 || August 10 || Braves || 1–0 (6) || Ritz (5–6) || Glavine (13–9) || Reed (3) || 65,157 || 53–63
|-  style="text-align:center; background:#fbb;"
| 117 || August 11 || Braves || 13–0 || Maddux (16–6) || Painter (4–6) || || 65,043 || 53–64
|-

Player stats

Batting

Starters by position 
Note: Pos = Position; G = Games played; AB = At bats; H = Hits; Avg. = Batting average; HR = Home runs; RBI = Runs batted in

Other batters 
Note: G = Games played; AB = At bats; H = Hits; Avg. = Batting average; HR = Home runs; RBI = Runs batted in

Pitching

Starting pitchers 
Note: G = Games pitched; IP = Innings pitched; W = Wins; L = Losses; ERA = Earned run average; SO = Strikeouts

Other pitchers 
Note: G = Games pitched; IP = Innings pitched; W = Wins; L = Losses; ERA = Earned run average; SO = Strikeouts

Relief pitchers 
Note: G = Games pitched; W = Wins; L = Losses; SV = Saves; ERA = Earned run average; SO = Strikeouts

Farm system

Notes

References
1994 Colorado Rockies at Baseball Reference
1994 Colorado Rockies team page at www.baseball-almanac.com

Colorado Rockies seasons
Colorado Rockies season
Colorado Rockies season
1990s in Denver